Unión Deportiva Salamanca, S.A.D. was a historical Spanish football team based in Salamanca, in the autonomous community of Castile and León.

Founded on 9 February 1923 and nicknamed Los Charros, the club played in white shirts and black shorts, holding home games at Estadio Helmántico, which seated 17,341 spectators.

History
Initially formed by Irish students, Salamanca first played in early Spanish championships in 1907, before an official league was founded later on. On 16 March 1923, at the tables of Café Novelty, situated in the Plaza Mayor, Dionisio Ridruejo set the club's early official foundations and, from 1939 and during the following three decades, it fluctuated between the third and the second levels of the Spanish football league.

In the 1974–75 season, Salamanca made its La Liga debuts, overachieving for a final 7th position (out of 18 teams), which eventually would be its best classification ever. The team lasted in the topflight until 1981, mainly coached by José Luis García Traid, then returned the following year for a further two seasons, being further relegated to Segunda División B – the new third division created in 1977 – in 1984–85, and spending three years in that category before promoting back.

In 1994–95's second division, after finishing fourth in the league, Salamanca lost the first leg of the promotion/relegation playoffs against Albacete Balompié, 0–2 at home, but won 5–0 away, returning to the main level after eleven years. The club was managed by 29-year-old Juan Manuel Lillo, also in charge for the following season, as the Castile and León club ranked 22nd and last in the top level.

From 1999 onwards (with two more visits to the first division, with 15th and 20th-place finishes respectively), Salamanca stabilized in the second level, save for the 2005–06 season spent in the third division, with the club winning the regular season and promoting in the playoffs. Veteran Quique Martín was arguably the most important player of the club in the decade, whilst Argentine Jorge D'Alessandro, who held the record for most games in the top division in the club's history, worked with the team as a manager in a further two spells (three in total).

2010–11 brought a club record ten consecutive defeats between December 2010/February 2011, and two coaching changes, as Salamanca returned to the third division after five years. On 18 June 2013, 90 years after its foundation, the club was liquidated due to the accumulation of unpaid debts.

Club background
Unión Deportiva Salamanca - (1923–2013)
Salamanca Athletic Club - (2013–2016) did not play in any matches
Salamanca Club de Fútbol UDS - (2013-)
Unionistas de Salamanca Club de Fútbol - (2013-)

Season to season

12 seasons in La Liga
34 seasons in Segunda División
9 seasons in Segunda División B
19 seasons in Tercera División

Last squad
Numbers taken from the official website: www.udsalamanca.es and www.lfp.es

Honours / Achievements
Segunda División: 1987–88, 1991–92, 1993–94
Segunda División B: 2005–06
La Liga: Promotion 1973–74, 1981–82, 1996–97

PlayersSee ''

References

External links
Official website 
Futbolme team profile 
Unofficial website 
Unofficial supporters forum 

 
1923 establishments in Castile and León
2013 disestablishments in Castile and León
Association football clubs established in 1923
Association football clubs disestablished in 2013
Defunct football clubs in Castile and León
Sport in Salamanca
Segunda División clubs
La Liga clubs